Rundown may refer to:
Rundown, an event in a baseball game
Rundown, a stew dish in the cuisines of Jamaica and Tobago, see Run down
Rundown (Scientology), a set of procedures in Scientology and Dianetics
RunDown Funk U Up, the debut album by D'banj
The Rundown, a 2003 film starring Dwayne Johnson
The Rundown (Philippine TV program), a 2010–2011 Philippine network news broadcast television program that aired on ABS-CBN News Channel
The Rundown (Singaporean TV program), a 2014–2018 Singaporean business news television program broadcast on CNBC Asia
The Rundown with José Diaz-Balart, a weekday morning political talk show on MSNBC in the United States
The Rundown with Robin Thede, a late-night talk show on BET in the United States
MFC 31: Rundown, a mixed martial arts event in the Canadian city of Edmonton in 2011, see MFC 31

See also
Decay (disambiguation)
Dilapidation, for example a run-down building